The Adventures of Shirley Holmes is a Canadian-British mystery TV series that originally aired from May 7, 1997, to May 7, 2000. The show was created by Ellis Iddon and Phil Meagher (of Winklemania Productions, UK) who had produced a successful series of books with HarperCollins, teaming up with Credo, Forefront, Winchester and Winklemania to develop the TV series. Filmed in Winnipeg, Manitoba, the series follows the life of Shirley Holmes, the great-great-niece of Sherlock Holmes who, with the help of ex-gang member Bo Sawchuk, tackles a variety of mysteries in and around the fictional city of Redington, Manitoba. On some occasions, she found herself matching wits with nemesis Molly Hardy (whose name is a word play on Sherlock Holmes' archenemy Professor Moriarty).

The show has been broadcast in over 80 countries and has been dubbed in French, Spanish, Italian, Portuguese, German, Norwegian, Russian, Serbian, Polish and Turkish.

Her performance in the show led to actress Meredith Henderson being nominated for a Gemini Award in 1998 and winning one in 1999. The show itself was twice nominated for a Gemini Award in the category "Best Children's or Youth Program or Series" in 1998 and eventually won it in 1999. In the spring of 1998 Susin Nielsen won a Gemini Award in the category "Best Writing in a Children's or Youth Program" for her screenplay of the episode "The Case of the Burning Building". In the same year, Elizabeth Stewart won a WGC Award from the Writers Guild of Canada for her writing of the episode "The Case of the Maestro's Ghost".

Credo spokesperson and producer Kim Todd named a growth spurt in the cast as one of the key reasons for cancelling the show. The aging of the actors would have meant a distinct change in tone and content had the show continued.

Cast and characters

{| class="wikitable"
! rowspan="2"|Actor !! rowspan="2"|Character !! rowspan="2"|Position !! colspan="4"|Seasons
|-
! class="unsortable" style="width:3.5%;"|1 !! class="unsortable" style="width:3.5%;"|2 !! class="unsortable" style="width:3.5%;"|3 !! class="unsortable" style="width:3.5%;"|4
|-
| Meredith Henderson || Shirley Holmes || The great-great-niece of Sherlock Holmes || colspan="4" style="background:#e0ffff; text-align:center;"| Main
|-
| John White || Francis Boris "Bo" Sawchuck || Shirley's sidekick. Watson counterpart || colspan="4" style="background:#e0ffff; text-align:center;"| Main
|-
| Sarah Ezer || Molly Hardy || Shirley's nemesis. Moriarty counterpart || colspan="4" style="background:#e0ffff; text-align:center;"| Main
|-
| Annick Obonsawin || Alicia Gianelli || Shirley's friend || colspan="4" style="background:#e0ffff; text-align:center;"| Main
|-
| Blair Slater ||  Bartholemew "Bart" James || Shirley and Bo's nerdy friend || colspan="4" style="background:#e0ffff; text-align:center;"| Main
|-
| Brendan Fletcher || Sterling "Stink" Patterson || Shirley and Bo's easygoing friend. Sebastian Moran counterpart || colspan="3" style="background:#e0ffff; text-align:center;"| Main || colspan="1" style="background:#ececec; color:gray; vertical-align:middle; text-align:center;" class="table-na"|
|-
| Chris Humphreys || Robert Holmes || Shirley's father || colspan="4" style="background:#e0ffff; text-align:center;"| Main
|-
| Elizabeth Shepherd || Peggy Holmes || Shirley's grandmother || colspan="3" style="background:#e0ffff; text-align:center;"| Main || colspan="1" style="background:#ececec; color:gray; vertical-align:middle; text-align:center;" class="table-na"|
|-
| Marie Stillin || Ms. Cynthia Stratmann || Headmistress of Sussex Academy || colspan="4" style="background:#e0ffff; text-align:center;"| Main
|-
| Colin Fox || Mr. Arthur Howie || Sussex History Teacher || colspan="4" style="background:#e0ffff; text-align:center;"| Main
|-
| Maggie Huculak || Dr. Joanna Holmes || Shirley's mother|| colspan="2" style="background:#ffe4e1; text-align:center;"|Recurring || colspan="2" style="background:#e0ffff; text-align:center;"| Main
|-
|}

Main characters

Meredith Henderson as Shirley Holmes: The great-great-niece of Sherlock Holmes, Shirley is the daughter of British diplomat Robert Holmes and virologist Dr. Joanna Holmes. She carries on her famous ancestor's legacy of solving crimes through deductive reasoning while attending the prestigious Sussex Academy. In addition to Sherlock's detective skills such as deductive reasoning and disguise, she also has his mannerisms, but she can still express her emotions. She prefers to keep a low profile so she can continue her sleuthing. She wears a variety of hats throughout the series.
John White as Francis Boris "Bo" Sawchuk: Shirley's sidekick. An ex-gang member from a Ukrainian family, Bo attends Sussex Academy on a scholarship. He first met Shirley in afterschool detention and was amazed at the girl detective's deductions about him. Shirley came to his aid after he was falsely accused of setting a work shed on campus on fire. After that case was solved, Bo became her sleuthing partner and best friend, akin to the relationship between 'Sherlock Holmes' and 'Dr. Watson'. He was supposed to be colorblind in first episode however that was never mentioned again. Bo is commonly mistaken as Shirley's boyfriend. His first appearance was in "The Case of the Burning Building." At the end of the series, he leaves for Ukraine to further his studies.
Sarah Ezer as Molly Hardy: Shirley's nemesis, and Moriarty counterpart. A newcomer to Sussex Academy, Molly first appeared as Alicia Gianelli's running mate during the school election for student council president. Through an elaborate scheme, Molly is elected student council president. Her true scheming nature is hidden from everyone except Shirley and Bo. Although her machinations are routinely thwarted by Shirley, Molly manages to escape punishment. She is revealed to be a sociopath in "The Case of the Crooked Comic" and is a mastermind of evil genius with an IQ of 160. Molly first appeared in "The Case of the Ruby Ring." It is possible that she is in fact descended from Professor Moriarty.
Annick Obonsawin as Alicia Gianelli: Alicia first appeared in "The Case of the Ruby Ring". Alicia is a good friend of Shirley and Bo, and she works at the Quazar Cafe, often mixing up orders of her customers. However, she also bows out easily to peer pressure and appears more simple-minded and materialistic than Shirley is.
Brendan Fletcher as Sterling "Stink" Patterson: Class clown and prankster.  His parents run the local novelty store.  If Molly is Shirley's 'Moriarty', Stink could be considered her 'Sebastian Moran', though while being a trouble-maker he is far less malicious.  Stink first appeared in "The Case of the Ruby Ring" and his last appearance was in "The Case Of The Crooked Comic".
Blair Slater as Bartholemew "Bart" James: Bart first appeared in "The Case of the Ruby Ring." He is highly interested in the paranormal and considers it good fortune to be abducted by aliens. He is also very concerned about his studies, as seen when Math is taken out of the curriculum in Sussex during "The Case of the Calculated Crime". He may be a little queer, but Bo and Shirley still treat him as a friend, and he is aware of Shirley's sleuthing activities and sometimes helps out.
Chris Humphreys as Robert Holmes: The great-nephew of Sherlock Holmes. Mr. Holmes first appeared in "The Case of the Burning Building." He is Shirley's father. He is mostly worried for his daughter because he knows her tendency to get involved in cases out of curiosity, and at first he had almost given up hope on finding his wife.
Elizabeth Shepherd as Peggy "Gran" Holmes: The niece of Sherlock Holmes. Shirley's grandmother and Mr. Holmes' mother.
Marie Stillin as Ms. Cynthia Stratmann: Headmistress of Shirley's school, Sussex Academy, an upright woman who always works hard to success. She appeared since first episode, The Case Of The Burning Building, where she caught Shirley arriving late to class, therefore giving her detention where she ended up meeting Bo. She has a close friendship with Mr. Howie and is a Molly Hardy supporter, unaware of Molly true intentions. 
Colin Fox as Mr. Arthur Howie: Shirley's history teacher at Sussex. He used to attend Sussex and boarded at the dorm, and was also a very popular student, as shown in "The Case of the Dead Debutante". However, he has kinder-phobia, the phobia of children, as revealed in "The Case of the Alien Abductions".
Maggie Huculak as Dr. Joanna Holmes: Shirley's mother, who had disappeared for several years as a result of being in Rwanda during a civil war. She, Shirley, and Robert are reunited when Mr. Holmes is offered the chance to go to Rwanda on business. It is often said that Shirley shares her curiosity and determination to never give up.

Supporting/Recurring Characters

R. Morgan Slade as Parker. Shirley's classmate who often hangs out with Shirley's gang. However he is barely involved in a case.
Nathan	as Watson the Dog. Shirley's dog.
Helen Roupp as Mrs. Fish. Lazy secretary of Sussex Academy. She is the opposite to Ms. Stratmann.
Michael Puttonen as Detective Tremain. He is always wrong about his suspicions, and is Shirley the one who solves the case instead of him.
Phillip Jarrett as Inspector Marquee. He is often after Bo' footsteps.
Jay Brazeau as Frank Patterson. Stink's father.
Arne MacPherson as Adam QuincyRick Howland as Bernie Szabo in "The Case of the Bouncing Baby"
Awaovieyi Agie Father Pierre Cayobanda.
Thomas Milburn Jr.	as Kasey Zee. Reporter.
Jonas Chernick as Daniel Devine. An artist that blamed Stink's dog as a cat killer. He also appeared as Mikola in The Case of the Desperate Dancer.
Dave 'Squatch' Ward as Jarrod. A motorcyclist that helped Ms. Stratmann in The Case Of The Bamboozling Blonde, he also appeared in The Case of the Liberated Beasts.
Kett Turton as Norman Melter, he replaced Stink. Somewhat eccentric guy.
Leslie Wolos as Heather, student in Sussex Academy, she starts dating Bo in last episode. She also appeared in other episodes as a different character.
Jennifer Lin as Bai Sung. She hides a secret about herself and suddenly turns into Bo's love interest that makes Shirley's more jealous than intrigued.
Bill Switzer as Matt. Shirley's love interest. At first they don't get along well, because Matt mistook Shirley and Bo as a couple, then both realized that they have lot in common.

Guest Stars

Ryan Gosling as Sean. A gang boy that has issues against Bo. He tried to kill Shirley and Bo in a fire in first episode.
John Neville as Dr. O. Henry. A young alien hidden in a human corpse that developed a close friendship with Bart.
Diana Leblanc as Rebecca Ratcliff. An actress that has unexplained accidents behind her. Shirley suspects that she knows her mom.
Rebecca Gibson as Angela. Rebecca's understudy. Actress in The Case Of The Second Sight.
George R. Robertson as Bart's Grandfather.
Shelley Duvall as Alice Flitt. Sussex librarian. Wannabe witch.
Janet-Laine Green as Ruth Monroe. Miss Stratmann friend since childhood that is always one step behind her.
Jennifer Clement as Constance Quick. Pretender woman that real name is Barbie Biddel "with double D". She is often receiving death threats.
Brennan Elliott as Jake Bain. Nice rising star that is struggling with fame.
Lisa Ryder as Jenny Bain. Singer jealous of her brother's fame.
Crystal Lowe as Pascal. Karate Girls leader, Episode: "The Case of the Open Hand".
Rebecca Henderson "Beki Lantos" as Mimi''', Episode: "The Case of the Open Hand".

Episode list

Season 1: 1997

Season 2: 1998

Season 3
Ep.1 - The Case Of The Celestial Signal - September 14, 1998
At the observatory, Bart hears signals from outerspace and runs into Shirley on the case. When two officials show up, it becomes clear that the man in charge of the observatory is not who he says he is.
Ep.2 - The Case Of The Galloping Ghost - September 21, 1998
At a horse ranch, the ghost of a horse seems to be stealing other horses. Shirley meets a boy working at the ranch that may be able to help solve the case.
Ep.3 - The Case Of The Crooked Comic - September 28, 1998
Molly and Stink are accused of stealing exam questions. Stink gets kicked out of the academy and sets out to become a stand-up comic.
Ep.4 - The Case Of The Flim Flam Farm - October 5, 1998
Mr. Howie stays at the Howie Farm, but when he stays their longer than he had expected, Shirley has questions. Not only do the animals on the farm act nuts, but there is a ghost legend, and a feud between the Howies and the Wilkinsons.
Ep.5 - The Case Of The Mysterious Message - October 12, 1998
Shirley receives a message that her grandmother has been kidnapped. As Shirley looks for her grandmother, her own friends think that she was abducted.
Ep.6 - The Case Of The Second Take - October 19, 1998
Alicia shoots a movie, but when strange occurrences and disappearances happen, Shirley follows the wrong suspect and puts herself in danger.
Ep.7 - The Case Of The Code Of Silence - October 26, 1998
To protect a friend, Bo sabotages the presses of the Redington Tribune.
Ep.8 - The Case Of The Bamboozling Blonde - November 2, 1998
After accepting a Woman of the Year award, Mrs. Stratmann is arrested for fraud. She is believed to be the wanted Honey Boulet, but Shirley believes that she's being framed.
Ep.9 - The Case Of The Real Fake - November 9, 1998
Shirley witnesses a death threat against author Constance Quick and believes that the intended target may be a lip-syncing singer Jake Bane.
Ep.10 - The Case Of The Open Hand - November 16, 1998
After Bo is attacked and his clothing is stolen by a gang of girls, Shirley joins them in order to find out more information about a former member they may have kidnapped.
Ep.11 - The Case Of The Ten Dollar Thief - November 23, 1998
Local stores are being robbed of $10 bills, and the thief is returning them afterwards. Shirley and Bo figure that the thief is looking for a special bill.
Ep.12 - The Case Of The Miraculous Mine - November 30, 1998
When a fever strikes a ruby mine in Rwanda, its cure provides clues to the whereabouts of Shirley's missing and presumed dead mother.
Ep.13 - The Case Of The Forbidden Mountain - December 7, 1998
Shirley and her dad head to Rwanda in order to gather more information on Shirley's mother.

Season 4
Ep.1 - The Case Of The Calculated Crime - February 13, 2000
Math classes at school are suspended due to budget cuts. Instead, the school receives new electronic equipment. Bo attends another school that has banned electronics and kept math in order to find out what's going on.
Ep.2 - The Case Of The Dead Debutante - February 20, 2000
A ghost takes over Alicia's body and tries to make her kill Mr. Howie.
Ep.3 - The Case Of The Vanishing Virus - February 27, 2000
A very rare and dangerous sample of a deadly virus is stolen from the laboratory.
Ep.4 - The Case Of The Virtual Zeus - March 5, 2000
Shirley and Bo, along with 'Cowboy Matt' try to find the head of Kaeon. Meanwhile, the students start a protest to get math classes back.
Ep.5 - The Basket Case - March 12, 2000
Strange incidents are keeping the Sussex Hornets from winning the basketball championships. After one of the 'accidents' causes Bo to hurt his ankle, Shirley decides to find out who is behind the sabotage.
Ep.6 - The Case Of The Skeleton in the Closet - March 19, 2000
Shirley discovers a skeleton out while walking Watson. However, she suspects something is suspicious when the coroner won't admit to the fact that the body had a ring on one of its fingers.
Ep.7 - The Case Of The Perfect Boyfriend - March 26, 2000
A French boy, Maurice, is trying to get Alicia's attention. Shirley believes that he is too perfect. Meanwhile, Alicia is also being scouted by an ad agent. The agent and Maurice seem to be connected.
Ep.8 - The Case Of The Falling Star - April 2, 2000
Shirley and Bo must protect a teen TV star from an assassin.
Ep.9 - The Case Of The Puzzle from the Past - April 9, 2000
When Shirley receives an orchid from a secret admirer, a bee sting sends her into an anaphylactic-shock-induced dream where she tries to figure out who was the sender, with the help of clips from past shows.
Ep.10 - The Case Of The Desperate Dancer - April 16, 2000
When a dancer in a visiting Ukrainian dance troop steals a religious icon, Bo learns an unpleasant Sawchuck family secret.
Ep.11 - The Case Of The Hidden Heart - April 23, 2000
Shirley and Bo discover a new side to Molly when they try to save Molly's horse, Foxglove, from being put down due to a suspected rabies infection.
Ep.12 - The Case Of King Arthur's Alibi - April 30, 2000
Shirley tries to find out what's wrong with Mr. Howie after he's arrested for imprisoning Ms. Stratmann during a medieval festival.
Ep.13 - The Case Of The Dragon's Breath - May 7, 2000
Bo gets sucked into a real-life adventure game.

Music
Original music was composed by Terry Frewer, although the theme tune was written and performed by show creators Ellis Iddon and Phil Meagher.

Trivia
Meredith Henderson, Shirley, was the only character who appeared in all episodes. John White, Bo, missed The Case Of The Forbidden Mountain, where he was only mentioned.
Elizabeth Shepherd, Peggy Holmes, doesn't appear anymore after The Case Of The Forbidden Mountain. It is said in The Case Of The Vanishing Virus, that she left to Fiji Islands for vacations, it is also the only season fourth episode where Chris Humphreys, Robert Holmes, appears.
"Stink" Patterson, Brendan Fletcher, is the only prominent character that left the series without explanation, his last appearance was in "The Case Of The Crooked Comic". It's supposed that Molly couldn't get Stink back in Sussex Academy.
The Case Of The Puzzle from the Past is the only episode where Shirley and Bo remember many characters that aren't anymore in the series, footage from previous episodes were used.

References

External links

1990s Canadian children's television series
2000s Canadian children's television series
1990s Canadian drama television series
2000s Canadian drama television series
1997 Canadian television series debuts
2000 Canadian television series endings
Canadian mystery television series
YTV (Canadian TV channel) original programming
Television series about teenagers
Television shows set in Manitoba
Television shows filmed in Winnipeg
Sherlock Holmes pastiches
Fictional characters from Manitoba